Princess Iron Fan is a fictional character from the Chinese classic novel Journey to the West.

Princess Iron Fan may also refer to:

Princess Iron Fan (1941 film), an animated film
Princess Iron Fan (1966 film), a live action film